Iłowo may refer to the following places:
Iłowo, Radziejów County in Kuyavian-Pomeranian Voivodeship (north-central Poland)
Iłowo, Sępólno County in Kuyavian-Pomeranian Voivodeship (north-central Poland)
Iłowo, West Pomeranian Voivodeship (north-west Poland)